Lance Wilkinson (14 March 1931 – 12 April 2011) was an Australian rules footballer who played with Hawthorn in the Victorian Football League (VFL).

Wilkinson, originally from State Savings Bank in the Victorian Amateur Football Association, represented the Victorian Amateurs in 1948. A rover and wingman, Wilkinson joined Hawthorn in 1949 and would make 116 appearances for the club. In 1955 he represented Victoria in an interstate match against South Australia at Adelaide Oval. He went to Brighton in 1957.

References

1931 births
Australian rules footballers from Victoria (Australia)
Hawthorn Football Club players
Brighton Football Club players
2011 deaths